Basnet or Basnyat is a common Nepali surname. This list provides links to biographies of people who share this common surname.

Notable people 

Abhiman Singh Basnet; First Chief of the Army of unified Nepal
Anita Basnet, Nepalese footballer
Arjun Kumar Basnet, South Asian Games marathon silver medalist
Bacchu Kailash, folk singer
Bakhtawar Singh Basnyat; Nepalese Mulkazi
Basanta Basnet, Nepalese journalist
Biren Basnet, Bhutanese footballer
Dhokal Singh Basnyat, Governor of Kumaun, Garhwal
Hari Bahadur Basnet, former minister
Kehar Singh Basnyat, General of the Army during Unification of Nepal
Khare Basnet, Bhutanese footballer
Kirtiman Singh Basnyat, Nepalese Mulkazi (equivalent to Prime Minister); Army Commander at Nepal Tibet war
Lal Bahadur Basnet, Nepalese politician
Madhab Basnet, Nepalese journalist
Mahesh Basnet, Former Minister of Industry
Mohan Bahadur Basnet, Nepalese politician
Naahar Singh Basnyat, Warrior of Nepal Army
Nischal Basnet, Nepalese Director, Producer and Actor
Pahalman Singh Basnyat, title of Khaptadi Raja, a Commanding Colonel
Parshuram Basnet, Notorious Don and CPN UML politician
Pushpa Basnet; Social worker (CNN Heroes Award 2012)
Raju Basnet Nepalese cricket player
Shakti Bahadur Basnet, Former Home Minister of Nepal
Shivaram Singh Basnyat, General of Army of Gorkha Kingdom; titled Senapati Badabir (trans. Chieftain Brave)
Singha Bahadur Basnyat, Former Chief (COAS) of Nepal Army
Subarna Prabha Devi, (born to Subudhi Basnyat); Queen Mother and Regent of Nepal
Tanka Basnet, Nepalese footballer
Tek Bahadur Basnet, Nepalese politician

References 

Lists of people by surname
Nepali-language surnames